My Early Burglary Years is a compilation album by Morrissey that was released in September 1998 in the United States on Reprise Records.  It follows in the tradition of his previous compilation albums Bona Drag and World of Morrissey in that it collects various single a-sides and b-sides, some album tracks, live tracks and previously unreleased material.

Track listing

References

External links 
 The A.V. Club review

Morrissey albums
B-side compilation albums
1998 compilation albums
Reprise Records compilation albums